Caprine may refer to:
A goat-antelope
Caprine, norleucine, aminoacid 
Ovicaprids, goats and sheep taken together in archaeology and paleontology
Caprine, an adjective that means "pertaining to or belonging to the subfamily Caprinae" (see goat-antelope, caprine arthritis encephalitis virus)